Ambayathode is a village near the famous Kottiyoor temple town in Kannur district of Kerala province in India. Ambayathodu witnessed massive landslides during Kerala Floods 2018.

Location
Ambayathode is located between Boys Town in Wayanad district and Kottiyoor in Kannur district. The town is the entry point for visitors to Kottiyoor temple from Bangalore side.

Attractions
Ambayathode is very scenic and less crowded than Kottiyoor.  There are five hairpends down from Boys Town to reach Ambayathode.  The first landmark is a big church being built in memory of Father Chavara.  There is a library dedicated to the memory of E.M.S.Namboodiripad.
There is another beautiful church called St.Mary's orthodox church.
There is a Pentecostal church of the Assemblies of God community.

Education
There are two schools called St. George LP School and Ambayathode UP School.

Economy
The people are mostly farmers.   Milk is a major product.  There is a milk society here run by the cooperative society of shepherds.

Transportation
The national highway passes through Kannur town.  Mangalore and Mumbai can be accessed on the northern side and Cochin and Thiruvananthapuram can be accessed on the southern side.  The road to the east of Iritty connects to Mysore and Bangalore.   The nearest railway station is Kannur on Mangalore-Palakkad line. There are airports at Kannur , Mangalore and Calicut.

Image gallery

References

Villages near Iritty